The Plutonium Playhouse is a theatre company in Halifax, Nova Scotia,  Canada that began as a non-profit society in 2010. Plutonium Playhouse Society initially mounted shows in a recording studio on Hunter Street in Halifax.

Plutonium is known for its development and encouragement of new work by Nova Scotia playwrights like Thom Fitzgerald, Lee-Anne Poole, Ryan Doucette, and Stewart Legere. A number of works originally presented by Plutonium Playhouse have gone on to tours and remounts across Canada, including Short Skirt Butch,  The Debacle, El Camino or the Field of Stars,  and Cloudburst, which was made into a popular movie starring Academy Award winners Olympia Dukakis and Brenda Fricker and Ryan Doucette,  and won over thirty film festival best picture awards.

The company is also known for its popular program The Sex Festival, which presents plays, readings and events on the subjects of sex and sexuality.

Artistic Directors
Thom Fitzgerald (2010–present)

Production History
Plutonium Playhouse Society was involved in producing or presenting the following productions:

PRODUCTIONS
7 Deadly Sins by Thom Fitzgerald 
The Asshole Monologues by Jane Kansas
Balls by Rob Salerno 
The Barnacle's Tale by Thom Fitzgerald 
Cloudburst by Thom Fitzgerald 
The Debacle by Susan Leblanc 
Down Dangerous Passes Road by Michel Marc Bouchard 
El Camino or the Field of Stars by Stewart Legere 
Fat Pig by Neil LaBute 
Kinky Kitten Club by Lee-Anne Poole 
Logan and I by Michael McPhee
Ms. Right Now by Natasha MacLellan 
The Obedients by Lee-Anne Poole 
Pluto's Playthings by Thom Fitzgerald 
Pourquoi pas? by Ryan Doucette
A Rescue Demonstration by Stewart Legere and Katie Swift
Short Skirt Butch by Lee-Anne Poole 
Splinters by Lee-Anne Poole 
Whale Riding Weather by Bryden MacDonald

PUBLIC READINGS
That's Happiness by Nate Crawford
With Bated Breath by Bryden MacDonald 
His Greatness by Daniel MacIvor

Critical response
Critical response to the works of Plutonium Playhouse Society has been generally positive. Ron Foley MacDonald called the original production of Cloudburst "a knockout" and the company "the most exciting thing to happen on the Halifax Theatre scene in a decade" Kate Watson wrote of the Plutonium production of Fat Pig, "The performances in this production are outstanding... Fat Pig is funny, touching, sexy and thought-provoking." while The Dalhousie Gazette proclaimed the show "pushed the audience’s comfort level." Independent critic Amanda Campbell praised Plutonium Playhouse's production of Rob Salerno's Balls as "tender, insightful and intelligent" and Plutonium's production of A Barnacle's Tale "literate, oddly insightful, strange, ridiculous, very unique and fun."

Works in The Sex Festival have been particularly well received. Kate Watson of The Coast Weekly called The Asshole Monologues "hilarious and charming" and named Plutonium's production of Whale Riding Weather one of the Ten Best productions of 2012.

Awards and Nominations for Works produced or presented by Plutonium Playhouse
Robert Merritt Awards Outstanding New Play by a Nova Scotia Playwright: Thom Fitzgerald, Cloudburst 
Robert Merritt Awards Nomination Outstanding Actress in a Leading Role: Deb Allen, Cloudburst 
Robert Merritt Awards Nomination Outstanding Actor in a Supporting Role: Ryan Doucette, Cloudburst 
Robert Merritt Awards Nomination Outstanding Set Design: Thom Fitzgerald, Cloudburst 
Robert Merritt Awards Nomination Outstanding Production, Cloudburst 
Robert Merritt Awards Nomination Outstanding New Play by a Nova Scotia Playwright: Lee-Anne Poole, Splinters 
Robert Merritt Awards Nomination Outstanding Actor in a Leading Role: Michael McPhee, Fat Pig 
Robert Merritt Awards Nomination Outstanding Actor in a Supporting Role: Matthew Lumley, Fat Pig 
Robert Merritt Awards Nomination Outstanding Actress in a Leading Role: Jessica Barry, Fat Pig 
Robert Merritt Awards Nomination Outstanding Actor in a Leading Role: Hugh Thompson, Whale Riding Weather 
Robert Merritt Awards Nomination Outstanding Actor in a Leading Role: Hugo Dann, Whale Riding Weather 
Robert Merritt Awards Nomination Outstanding Actor in a Supporting Role: Ryan Doucette, Whale Riding Weather 
Robert Merritt Awards Nomination Outstanding Original Composition or Score: Jason Michael MacIsaac & Stewart Legere, Pluto's Playthings
Robert Merritt Awards Nomination Outstanding Sound: Christopher Francis Mitchell, Pluto's Playthings
Nova Scotia Masterworks Award Nomination: Susan Leblanc, The Debacle
24th Atlantic Fringe Festival Best Male Performance Award: Hugo Dann, Whale Riding Weather
24th Atlantic Fringe Festival Fringe Hit! Award, Whale Riding Weather

References

Theatre companies in Nova Scotia